Venuta is a surname. Notable people with the surname include:

Benay Venuta (1910–1995), American actress, singer and dancer
Gianpaolo Venuta (born 1978), Canadian actor